Rubycon is the sixth studio album by German electronic music group Tangerine Dream. It was released in 1975. It is widely regarded as one of their best albums. Rubycon further develops the Berlin School sequencer-based sound they ushered in with the title track from Phaedra.

Although not quite matching the sales figures for Phaedra, Rubycon reached number 10 in a 14-week run, their highest-charting album in the UK.

Music
The album consists of two long tracks, each just over 17 minutes long. "Rubycon, Part One", the A-side of the LP, "ebbs and flows through tense washes of echo and Mellotron choirs, as primitive sequencer lines bubble to the surface”. The B-side, "Rubycon, Part Two", "opens in a wonderfully haunted way" before "the synthesizer arpeggios return to drive things along".

Critical reception

From contemporary reviews, Chris Salewicz of the NME wrote that "a touch more electronically sophisticated than Phaedra [...] perhaps, and the technological massed choir that floods out of the speakers a couple of minutes into Part Two indicates a considerable degree of carefully wired panache." Salewicz summarized the group as being "so thoroughly frustrating because there's nothing you come across which you find you can actively dislike. On the other hand there really does appear to be little there for the moment which warrants more than a luke-warm vague affection that, broken down, would seem close to some nebulous sympathy."

Tom Moon includes Rubycon in his 2008 book 1,000 Recordings to Hear Before You Die, saying: "This voyaging vision of sound, ever-unfolding and not quite ever arriving, has been imitated endlessly since 1975. But somehow its admirers haven’t quite captured the openness and faraway grandeur of Tangerine Dream."

In his 1997 book Digital Gothic: A Critical Discography of Tangerine Dream, music journalist Paul Stump praises the album, noting:
“Rubycon is simply a refinement of its predecessor—but to an acme of excellence, and demonstrates a mastery of primitive technology breathtaking in its audacity, tenacity and sheer artistic vision. It is probably the best album the band have made…”

Tour
After the album was released, Christopher Franke's Moog synthesizer was damaged in transit during a tour and Franke himself was nearly killed by an electrical shock.

Track listing

A New CD version was issued in 2019 re-mastered from the original master tapes. It contained the extra bonus track 'Rubycon' (extended introduction) mixed by Steven Wilson. This track is previously unreleased.

Personnel
 Edgar Froese - mellotron, guitar and VCS 3 synthesizer on "Rubycon, Part One" ; organ, mellotron, guitar, gong and VCS 3 synththesizer on "Rubycon, Part Two"
 Christopher Franke - double Moog synthesizer, Synthi A, organ, modified Elka organ and prepared piano on "Rubycon, Part One" ; double Moog synthesizer, gong, Synthi A, and organ on "Rubycon, Part Two"
 Peter Baumann - organ, EMS Synthi A, electric piano (Fender Rhodes) and prepared piano on "Rubycon, Part One" ; electric piano (Fender Rhodes), organ, EMS Synthi A, voice and ARP 2600 on "Rubycon, Part Two"
Production credits
 Monique Froese – photography
 Mick Glossop – engineer
 Roland Paulick  – technical assistance

Charts

Single
A single titled Extracts From "Rubycon" was released in March 1975.

Both tracks of this single were included as part of the compilation The Virgin Years 1974–1978 in 2011.

References

External links
 

1975 albums
Tangerine Dream albums
Virgin Records albums